Lawrence Dena is an Anglican bishop in Kenya; he is the current Bishop of Malindi.

Dena was born in Rabai. He was educated at the Teachers College in Kericho and the Nairobi International School of Theology. He was ordained in 1994 in Mombasa, and served at St. Augustine Mombasa. In 2003 he became a Canon at All Saints' Cathedral, Nairobi. He was consecrated Assistant Bishop of Mombassa in 2005.  He was Provincial Secretary to Archbishop Benjamin Nzimbi from 2006 to 2009. He is Chairman of the All Africa Conference of Churches.

References

21st-century Anglican bishops of the Anglican Church of Kenya
Anglican bishops of Malindi
Year of birth missing (living people)
Living people
People from Kilifi County
People educated at Trinity Grammar School (New South Wales)
University of Sydney alumni